The Surveyor General of South Australia (also stylised Surveyor-General) is a position originally created for the Surveyor General for the colony of South Australia. The post is held by an official responsible for government surveying.

List of Surveyors General of South Australia

References

Lists of British, Australian and New Zealand Surveyors-General, Government Geologists...
Australian Dictionary of Biography Surveyor-General search

1836 establishments in Australia
Government of South Australia